John Lincoln Clem (nicknamed Johnny Shiloh; August 13, 1851 – May 13, 1937) was an American general officer who served as a drummer boy in the Union Army during the American Civil War. He gained fame for his bravery on the battlefield, becoming the youngest noncommissioned officer in the history of the United States Army.

He retired from the Army in 1915, having attained the rank of brigadier general in the Quartermaster Corps; he was at that time the last veteran of the American Civil War still on duty in the United States Armed Forces, although others similarly aged and experienced such as Peter Conover Hains and Albert A. Michelson rejoined the military after World War I started.

By special act of Congress on August 29, 1916, he was promoted to major general one year after his retirement.

Career

American Civil War

Born with the surname "Klem" in Newark, Ohio on August 13, 1851, the son of Roman and Magdalene Klem. He is said to have run away from home at age 9 in May 1861, after the death of his mother in a train accident, to become a Union Army drummer boy. First he attempted to enlist in the 3rd Ohio Infantry but was rejected because of his age and small size. He then tried to join the 22nd Michigan, which also refused him. He tagged along anyway and the 22nd eventually adopted him as mascot and drummer boy. Officers chipped in to pay him the regular soldier's wage of $13 a month and allowed him to officially enlist two years later.

A popular legend suggests that Clem served as a drummer boy with the 22nd Michigan at the Battle of Shiloh. The legend suggests that he came very near to losing his life when a fragment from a shrapnel shell crashed through his drum, knocking him unconscious and that subsequently his comrades who found and rescued him from the battlefield nicknamed Clem "Johnny Shiloh." The weight of historical evidence however suggests that Clem could not have taken part in the battle of Shiloh; the 22nd Michigan appears to be the first unit in which Clem served in any capacity, but the regiment had not yet been constituted at the time of the battle, mustering into service in August 1862, four months after the battle. The Johnny Shiloh legend appears instead to stem from a popular Civil War song, "The Drummer Boy of Shiloh" by William S. Hays.

Regardless of the time of his entry into service, Clem served as a drummer boy for the 22nd Michigan at the Battle of Chickamauga. He is said to have ridden an artillery caisson to the front and wielded a musket trimmed to his size. In the course of a Union retreat, he shot a Confederate colonel who had demanded his surrender. After the battle, the "Drummer Boy of Chickamauga" was promoted to sergeant, the youngest soldier ever to be a noncommissioned officer in the United States Army. Secretary of the Treasury, later Chief Justice of the United States, and fellow Ohioan, Salmon P. Chase, decorated him for his heroics at Chickamauga. Clem's fame for the shooting is also open for debate, despite press reports supporting the story into the early 20th century. It is possible that he wounded Colonel Calvin Walker, whose 3rd Tennessee opposed the 22nd Michigan towards the end of the battle.

In October 1863, Clem was captured in Georgia by Confederate cavalrymen while detailed as a train guard. The Confederates confiscated his U.S. uniform, including his cap, which had three bullet holes in it, which reportedly upset him terribly. He was included in a prisoner exchange a short time later, and the Confederate newspapers used his age and celebrity status for propaganda purposes, to show "what sore straits the Yankees are driven when they have to send their babies out to fight us." After participating with the Army of the Cumberland in many other battles, serving as a mounted orderly, he was discharged in September 1864. Clem was wounded in combat twice during the war.

Later life
Clem graduated from high school in 1870. In 1871, he was elected commander/captain of the "Washington Rifles", a District of Columbia militia unit. After he failed the entrance exam to enter the United States Military Academy, President Ulysses S. Grant appointed him second lieutenant in the 24th Infantry Regiment in December 1871. Clem was promoted to first lieutenant in 1874. Clem graduated from artillery school at Fort Monroe in 1875. He was promoted to captain in 1882 and transferred to the Quartermaster Department where he stayed for the rest of his career. He was promoted to major in 1895.

During the Spanish–American War in 1898 he served as depot quartermaster in Portland, Oregon as well as department quartermaster for the Department of Columbia. He then served in the occupation of Puerto Rico as depot and chief quartermaster in San Juan.

Clem was promoted to lieutenant colonel in 1901 and to colonel in 1903. He then served from 1906 to 1911 as chief quartermaster at Fort Sam Houston in Texas.

Clem reached the mandatory retirement age of 64 on August 13, 1915, when he was retired and promoted to the rank of brigadier general, as was customary for American Civil War veterans who retired at the rank of colonel. Clem was the last veteran of the American Civil War serving in the U.S. Army at the time of his retirement, though another Civil War veteran, Peter Conover Hains, re-entered the service in 1917. On August 29, 1916, Clem was promoted on the retired list to the rank of major general.

Personal life

He married Anna Rosetta French, daughter of Major General William H. French, on May 24, 1875 in Maryland. After her death in 1899, he married Bessie Sullivan of San Antonio in 1903. Sullivan was the daughter of a Confederate veteran, leading Clem to claim that he was "the most united American" alive. Clem was the father of three children. Clem was a companion of the Military Order of the Loyal Legion of the United States and the Military Order of Foreign Wars.

After retirement he lived in Washington, D.C. before returning to San Antonio, Texas. He died in San Antonio on May 13, 1937, and was buried in Arlington National Cemetery.

Dates of promotion
Through his military career Clem held the following ranks:
 Musician and Lance Sergeant, Co. C, 22nd Michigan Infantry – 1 May 1863 to 19 September 1864
 2nd Lieutenant – 18 December 1871
 1st Lieutenant – 5 October 1874
 Captain – 4 May 1882
 Major – 16 May 1895
 Lieutenant Colonel – 2 February 1901
 Colonel – 15 August 1903
 Brigadier General (Retired) – 13 August 1915
 Major General (Retired) – 29 August 1916

Awards
 Civil War Campaign Medal
 Indian Campaign Medal
 Spanish War Service Medal

Memorialization
 A 6-foot bronze statue of young John Clem stands near the Buckingham Meeting House in Newark, Ohio.
The ship was scrapped in 1948.
 A public school in Newark, Ohio, is named after him: Johnny Clem Elementary School.
 The city of Heath, Ohio, is co-extensive with Johnny Clem Township.

Film portrayals
In 1963, Walt Disney produced a made-for-TV film entitled Johnny Shiloh, with Kevin Corcoran in the title role. The film was telecast on the Disney anthology television series. The Sherman Brothers wrote the film's theme song; their 1968 movie musical score for The One and Only Genuine Original Family Band also included a song about him called "Drummin', Drummin', Drummin'," performed in the film by Walter Brennan who played an ex-Confederate soldier.

In 2007 Historical Productions released the movie Johnny: The True Story of a Civil War Legend, starring Cody Piper in the role of Johnny Lincoln (Shiloh) Clem. The film, which mixes historical and fictional narratives, includes numerous U.S. Civil War reenactments, and focuses on what life was like for Union soldiers.

See also

 Child soldiers
 Drummer boy (military)
 Robert Henry Hendershot

References

External links

 
 Documentary on the true story of "Johnny Clem" produced by Historical Productions
 The Song behind the 'Johnny Shiloh myth
 The duty roster that shows John Clem was enlisted in the 22nd Michigan Company C. He is the 32nd name down the list.

1851 births
1937 deaths
People from Newark, Ohio
Union Army soldiers
Child soldiers in the American Civil War
People of Ohio in the American Civil War
United States Army generals
Burials at Arlington National Cemetery
Quartermasters
American folklore
American Civil War prisoners of war